Gedling Borough Council elections are held every four years. Gedling Borough Council is the local authority for the non-metropolitan district of Gedling in Nottinghamshire, England. Since the last boundary changes in 2015, 41 councillors have been elected from 19 wards.

Political control
The first election to the council was held in 1973, initially operating as a shadow authority before coming into its powers on 1 April 1974. Since 1973 political control of the council has been held by the following parties:

Leadership
The leaders of the council since 2003 have been:

Council elections
1973 Gedling Borough Council election
1976 Gedling Borough Council election (New ward boundaries)
1979 Gedling Borough Council election
1983 Gedling Borough Council election
1987 Gedling Borough Council election (Some new ward boundaries & borough boundary changes also took place)
1991 Gedling Borough Council election (Borough boundary changes took place but the number of seats remained the same)
1995 Gedling Borough Council election
1999 Gedling Borough Council election
2003 Gedling Borough Council election (New ward boundaries reduced the number of seats by 7)
2007 Gedling Borough Council election
2011 Gedling Borough Council election
2015 Gedling Borough Council election (New ward boundaries reduced the number of seats from 50 to 41)
2019 Gedling Borough Council election

Borough result maps

Changes between elections

1995-1999

2011-2015

2015-2019 
Conservative councillor Sarah Hewson (Plains) resigned from the party in March 2018.

2019-2023

References

By-election results

External links
Gedling Borough Council

 
Council elections in Nottinghamshire
Gedling
District council elections in England